Blepharomastix cronanalis is a moth in the family Crambidae. It was described by William Schaus in 1924. It is found in Peru.

The wingspan is about 22 mm. The wings are white with terminal fuscous-black points. The lines are fine and buffy brown. The forewing costal margin is suffused with buffy brown and there is an outcurved antemedial line followed by a broken ocellus in the cell at the subcosta. There is a line on the discocellular of the hindwings.

References

Moths described in 1924
Blepharomastix